Anal sphincter muscles may refer to:

 External anal sphincter
 Internal anal sphincter